Ahmad Azzam (born 27 June 1977) is a Syrian former footballer.

References

1977 births
Living people
Syrian footballers
Syria international footballers
Sportspeople from Damascus
Al-Jaish Damascus players
Al-Wahda SC (Syria) players
Association football midfielders
Syrian Premier League players
Al-Jaish Damascus managers